Chaugacha (also written as Chowgachha, Chaugachha) is a village  in the Chakdaha CD block in the Kalyani subdivision of the Nadia district in the state of West Bengal, India.

Geography                                         

Demographics
According to the 2011 Census of India, Chaugachha had a total population of 8,603, of which 4,442 (52%) were males and 4,161 (48%) were females. Population in the age range 0–6 years was 837. The total number of literate persons in Chaugachha was 6,098 (78.52% of the population over 6 years).

Healthcare
Chaugacha Block Primary Health Centre, with 10 beds at Chaugacha, is the major government medical facility in the Chakdaha CD block.

References

Villages in Nadia district